× Phyllosasa  is a nothogenus (genus of hybrid origin) of Japanese bamboo in the grass family.

It consists of a single nothospecies of bamboo, × Phyllosasa tranquillans, native to woodland in southern Honshu in Japan. It is considered to be a hybrid between Phyllostachys nigra var. henonsis and Sasa veitchii f. tyugokensis.

The variegated cultivar 'Shiroshima' is found in cultivation.

References

Bambusoideae
Endemic flora of Japan
Plant nothogenera
Bambusoideae genera
Monotypic Poaceae genera